The Jaguar Mark VII is a four-door luxury car produced by Jaguar Cars of Coventry from 1951 to 1956. Launched at the 1950 British International Motor Show as the successor to the Jaguar Mark V, it was called the Mark VII because there was already a Bentley Mark VI on the market.  A version of the Jaguar Mark V with the XK engine had been designated as the Mark VI, but it is thought that only two were built.

In its original 1950 form the Mark VII could exceed 100 mph, and in 1952 it became the first Jaguar to be made available with an optional automatic transmission.

Mark VIIs were successful in racing and rallying.

Mark VII 1950–1954 
The new model's body looked more streamlined, with integrated headlights and mudguards, a two-piece windscreen, and longer rear overhang. As on the Mark V, the rear wheels were partially covered by removable spats.

Whereas the Mark V had a prewar pushrod engine originally developed by the Standard Motor Company, the Mark VII was powered by the newly developed XK engine. First seen in production form in the 1948 XK120, the 3442 cc DOHC straight-six provided , the same as in the XK120, and the saloon's claimed top speed was over 100 mph (160 km/h).

When the car was being developed, Jaguar thought it would find most of its customers overseas, mainly because UK car tax at that time penalised buyers of larger-engined cars. However it went into production just as Britain's postwar economic austerity began to ease, and in 1951 the car's enthusiastic reception in both the British and American markets prompted Jaguar to relocate production to larger premises, at the Browns Lane plant, which had been built for wartime production as a shadow factory and was now available for immediate use.

The published performance figures for the Mark VII were based on the standard 8:1 compression ratio, but as this was unsuitable for the UK market's low-octane Pool petrol, a 7:1 engine was optional. British motoring magazines tested the car's performance with the higher compression ratio, using the Ostend to Brussels autoroute in Belgium, where 80 octane fuel was available. The test car cost £1693 including taxes.

In 1952 the Mark VII became the first Jaguar to be offered with an automatic transmission.

By the time the model was upgraded to M specification in 1954, 20,908 had been produced.

Mark VII M 1954–1956 

The Mark VII M was launched at the British International Motor Show in October 1954.

The four-speed manual gearbox remained the standard fitting but was now constant mesh and fitted with closer ratios, while the Borg Warner automatic, hitherto available only on exported Mark VIIs, now became optional for British buyers. Larger torsion bars were fitted to the front suspension. Flasher-type traffic indicators replaced semaphore arms.

Distinguishing the Mark VII M from its predecessor, circular grilles over the horns were installed below the headlights in place of the former integrated auxiliary lamps, which were moved slightly further apart up-rated and mounted on the bumper. Both bumpers now wrapped further around the sides of the car. New large tail lamps with built-in reflectors now incorporated direction indicators. New headlamps were given Le Mans type diffuser glasses. Seats were now full length and incorporated Dunlopillo.

In 1956, with the advent of the Suez Crisis, Britain anticipated fuel rationing, and bubble cars appeared on the streets. Jaguar switched focus to their smaller saloons (the Mark I 2.4 had been introduced in 1955), and neither the Mark VII M nor any of its increasingly powerful but fuel-thirsty successors would match the production volumes of the original Jaguar Mark VII.   Nevertheless, before it was superseded by the Mark VIII, the Mark VII M achieved 10,061 sales during its two-year production run.

Racing and rallying

Both variants of the Mark VII won race victories, and an M version won a Monte Carlo Rally.

In 1954 Jaguar built a lightweight Mark VII M which, although intended for racing, never participated in contemporary events. Road-registered KRW 621, it had magnesium body panels, D-type engine, Dunlop disc brakes and modified suspension.

Factory-entered Mark VIIs won the Daily Express International Trophy Production Touring Car race at Silverstone five years running, and twice took the top three places. Stirling Moss won in 1952 and 1953; Ian Appleyard in 1954, with Tony Rolt and Stirling Moss 2nd and 3rd; Mike Hawthorn in 1955, from his teammates Jimmy Stewart and Desmond Titterington in 2nd and 3rd; and Ivor Bueb in 1956, with Belgian journalist and racing driver Paul Frère taking 4th.

In January 1956 a Mark VII M driven by Ronnie Adams, Frank Biggar, and Derek Johnstone won the Monte Carlo Rally.

In August 1956, at Road America, in Elkhart Lake, Wisconsin, Paul Goldsmith's Mark VII averaged 59.2 mph to win a 100-mile NASCAR Grand National race for cars up to 3500 cc.

Sources 

 Schrader, Halwart: Typenkompass Jaguar - Personenwagen seit 1931, Motorbuch-Verlag, Stuttgart (2001), 
 Stertkamp, Heiner: Jaguar - Die komplette Chronik von 1922 bis heute, 2. Auflage, Heel-Verlag (2006),

References 

Mark 7
Rear-wheel-drive vehicles
Sports sedans
1950s cars
Cars introduced in 1950
Limousines